Live scores is a type of service offered by many sports-related websites and broadcasters as well as online sports betting operators. The idea of live scores is to provide real time information about sports results from various disciplines. Live scores are usually free and are very popular among sports betting enthusiasts, as they allow viewing collected data on many sports events. In the past, live score services were only available on TV through teletext or on the radio. There are now many websites providing live scores. It is possible to follow live results of many events at the same time. Some sites provide additional information, such as a player list, card details, substitution and an online chat where sports fans can gather and discuss the current event. Several sports organizations such Major league baseball and the National Football League have set up their own networks to deliver live scores via mobile phones.

References

Sport websites